Narodna Skupština means "National Assembly", also "National Parliament" in Serbian. It may refer to:

 Narodna Skupština Republike Srbije, the National Assembly of Serbia
 Narodna Skupština Republike Srpske, the National Assembly of the Republic of Srpska (Bosnia and Herzegovina)
 Narodna Skupština, the National Assembly of Revolutionary Serbia